Robert Gerald Hatchwell (30 May 1920 – 30 August 1976) was a New Zealand water polo player.

At the 1950 British Empire Games he won the silver medal as part of the men's water polo team.

References

1920 births
1976 deaths
Commonwealth Games silver medallists for New Zealand
New Zealand male water polo players
Water polo players at the 1950 British Empire Games
Commonwealth Games competitors for New Zealand